The Qatari Volleyball League (QVL) is a professional volleyball league in Qatar at the top of the Qatari volleyball league system. It was founded in 1979.

Teams

2020–21 
Al Ahli S.C.
Al Arabi S.C.
Al Gharafa S.C.
Al Khor S.C.
Al Rayyan S.C.
Al Sadd S.C.
Al Shamal S.C.
Police  S.C.
Qatar  S.C.
Al Wakra

Champions

References 

Volleyball in Qatar
Sports leagues in Qatar
Qatar